Life Is Good (foaled 22 April 2018) is a multiple Grade I winning American Thoroughbred racehorse who won the 2021 Breeders' Cup Dirt Mile and 2022 Pegasus World Cup.

Background
Life Is Good is a bay colt that was bred in Kentucky by Gary and Mary West Stable. His sire is Into Mischief and his dam is Beach Walk who was sired by Distorted Humor.  Life Is Good is the second foal and second winner from his dam, and her only stakes winner. The dam also has a Blame filly and a Candy Ride (ARG) colt.

Life Is Good was a $525,000 purchase from the Paramount Sales consignment at the 2019 Keeneland September Yearling Sale by China Horse Club and Maverick Racing which is the buying arm of WinStar Farm.

Initially, in his first three starts Life Is Good was trained by Bob Baffert but in the midst of his three-year-old career was transferred to Todd A. Pletcher's barn.

Racing career

2020: Two-year-old season

Life Is Good began his career on November 22 at Del Mar Racetrack in a Maiden Special Weight for two-year-olds at six and 1/2 furlongs. Starting at very short odds of 1/5on against four other horses, Life Is Good jumped out alertly from the inside stall and immediately got the lead. He led throughout the race with jockey Mike Smith and drew off and was ridden out to the wire to win easily by  lengths in a time of 1:15.50.

2021: Three-year-old season
Life Is Good made his first start as a three-year-old in the Sham Stakes at Santa Anita Park on January 2. Installed as the 1/5 odds-on favorite in the five horse field, Life Is Good went to the early lead and set sensible fractions while maintaining an advantage of three to four lengths down the backstretch and into the stretch. Stablemate Medina Spirit, raced in second throughout, made a late run to close to within three-quarters of a length, with the third-place finisher 13 lengths further back. Jockey Mike E. Smith's commented, "It was his first time around two turns. He got away just a little slow, but he got up and of course he's naturally so quick, he was just up underneath himself. Just as we were heading for home, he was doing things all by himself so easy out there."

Life Is Good made his next start in the San Felipe Stakes on March 6. Again Life Is Good was the favorite at 1/2, and he went to the early lead and was never challenged although drifting in the stretch run, winning by eight lengths over Medina Spirit, with Dream Shake third. After the race trainer Bob Baffert said,  "He's still green. They do all that weaving one race … they're still babies. They're still immature. The main thing is he came out of it really well. We saw a lot of raw talent yesterday." After the event Life Is Good had collected 60 qualification points for the Road to the Kentucky Derby and sitting second in the standings.

After a workout on March 20 an examination followed and it was found that had an apparent hind-end injury. On 26 March went through surgery for the removal of a small chip in his left hind ankle. Trainer Bob Baffert responded, "He couldn't have worked more beautifully. It was a great, nice cruising work like he usually does. He's so light on his feet. He came back (to the barn), the rider said he felt great … Then all of a sudden later in the morning, you could tell something was bothering him in the hind leg." Life Is Good was to have been pointed to the Santa Anita Derby but those plans and the Triple Crown events were abandoned.

With the ramifications of trainer Bob Baffert being suspended in Kentucky and in New York by NYRA due to stablemate's Medina Spirit post positive drug test after finishing first the 2021 Kentucky Derby connections of Life Is Good moved him to Todd A. Pletcher and on June 24 he had his first work out at Keeneland after the successful operation.

In his first start for Todd A. Pletcher, Life Is Good was entered in the Grade I H. Allen Jerkens Memorial Stakes at Saratoga Race Course. A sprint race for three-year-olds Life Is Good clashed with sprinting sensation Jackie's Warrior who was coming off an easy win in the Amsterdam Stakes. From the widest barrier, number 6, Life Is Good, burst away to a two-length lead over Jackie's Warrior after a half-mile in :44.16. As they entered the straight Jackie's Warrior cut into the margin and forged to the leading by about a half a length before jockey Mike E. Smith pressured Life Is Good. Life Is Good cut into the margin but was beaten by a neck on the line in a time of 1:21.39 on a fast track. Todd A. Pletcher after the event was very pleased, commenting "He ran super. Running 1:21 and 1 off a layoff. It was a big effort."

In his next start on September 25 at Belmont Park in the Grade II Kelso Handicap. Life Is Good faced three older horses. Ridden by Irad Ortiz Jr. for the first time and starting at the prohibitive odds of 1/20 he had little trouble handling his first-time older opponents  as he breezed to a  lengths victory. Ortiz commented after the race, "He did it very easily. When I asked him, he just took off."

In his last start of the year, Life Is Good was shipped back to the West Coast for the Breeders' Cup which was held at Del Mar Racetrack. Originally, it was hoped that Life Is Good would run in the Breeders' Cup Classic but since he lost time during the season with injury and recovery from an operation his connections with Pletcher decided that the Breeders' Cup Dirt Mile would be an ideal race to have Life Is Good run in. Life Is Good, starting as the 7/10 odds-on favorite bounced out in front to leading his elder rivals by 1 length. He continued undeterred and turned back his main challenger Ginobili to win by  lengths in a time of 1:34.12. Accolades were given from owners, Elliott Walden, CEO, president, and racing manager of WinStar Farm and trainer Todd Pletcher describing the performance as "An exceptional talent!"

2022: Four-year-old season
Life Is Good started the year with a  lengths win over champion Knicks Go in the Pegasus World Cup on January 29 at Gulfstream Park. Todd Pletcher's reaction after the race was, "I can't think of a horse (I trained) better than him. He's extra special. He has that unique ability to go fast and just keep going." Elliott Walden, president, CEO, and racing manager of owner Kenny Troutt's WinStar Farm, noted, “We've seen him train in the morning and he never gets tired, so when he was as far in front as he was, we knew he was not going to stop."

Connections indicated that Life Is Good's would be pointed to the Dubai World Cup at Meydan Racecourse in Dubai on March 26. Pletcher indicated that they were in no rush to make a decision and felt that the horse was talented enough to do just about anything, including getting a mile and a quarter. Life Is Good flew to Dubai on 14 March 2022. Life Is Good was made the 8/13 odds-on favourite by British bookmakers and with his quick speed went to the front and led. But down the stretch, he was collared and weakened with 50 yards to go, finishing fourth to Country Grammer, beaten by 2 1/4 lengths.

On 2 July, Life Is Good was entered in the Grade II John A. Nerud Stakes at Belmont Park. He was pushed by the grade 1-winning Speaker's Corner through quick fractions of :22.19, :44.70, and 1:08.83 but  pulled away to score by five lengths over that rival in 1:21.70 for the seven furlongs. Starting as the 1-5 odds-on favorite, Life Is Good with jockey Flavien Prat quickly grabbed the lead from the rail with Speaker's Corner stalking but beginning to drop back after a half-mile.

Five weeks later, Life Is Good returned to Saratoga Race Course on a day when a crowd of 39,478 turned out to witness the Grade I Whitney Stakes. The race began with jockey Irad Ortiz Jr. using Life Is Good's sharp early speed to break from the gate quickly and open a clear lead by the time the field reached the first turn in the  miles test. Life Is Good led by  lengths over third-choice Hot Rod Charlie and was still ahead by two lengths after six furlongs in a quick 1:10.93. Happy Saver and Hot Rod Charlie took runs at him in early stretch, but Ortiz angled Life Is Good to the inside toward Happy Saver in midstretch and won by two lengths in 1:48.97 as the 4/5 odds-of favorite.

On October 1, a small field with Life Is Good was declared for the running of the Grade I Woodward Stakes at Aqueduct Racetrack. Breaking from the rail, where there were some puddles of water on the sloppy, sealed track from 0.74 inches of rainfall, jockey Irad Ortiz Jr. broke quickly with Life Is Good and moved out a couple of paths. The fractions were comfortable as Life Is Good reeled off splits of :24.40, and :48.60. On the final turn, Law Professor moved alongside Life Is Good, but in the stretch under urging from Ortiz, he moved away to open a clear lead of  lengths in mid-stretch and stayed on top while covering the  miles in 1:49.57 as the 1/20 odds-on favorite. The Breeders' Cup Classic is the next target for Life Is Good.

In his last career start Life Is Good finished fifth after leading into the straight to Flightline in the 2022 Breeders' Cup Classic at Del Mar Racecourse. According to Equibase, before he finished fifth, Life Is Good laid down early fractions as impressive as Flightline's final time. His opening quarter of :22.55, half-mile in :45.47, and six furlongs in 1:09.62 were the fastest among 51 races at 10 furlongs run at Keeneland since 1991.

Statistics

Notes:

An (*) asterisk after the odds means Life Is Good was the post-time favorite.

Stud career
It was announced after the Breeders' Cup that upon his retirement from racing, Life Is Good would take up stallion duties at WinStar Farm in 2023. He will be standing for $100,000 in his initial season.

Pedigree

References

2018 racehorse births
Racehorses bred in Kentucky
Racehorses trained in the United States
Thoroughbred family 13-c
American Grade 1 Stakes winners